Allan Cooke (9 April 1930 – 12 May 2010) was an Australian rules football player who played in the Victorian Football League (VFL) between 1949 and 1958 for the Richmond Football Club. He was also a long time Committee member of the club.

He was made a life member of Richmond in 1958 and was inducted into the Club's Hall of Fame in 2006.

References 

 Hogan P: The Tigers Of Old, Richmond FC, Melbourne 1996
Richmond Football Club - Hall of Fame

Richmond Football Club players
Australian rules footballers from Victoria (Australia)
1930 births
2010 deaths